Women's football in the United Arab Emirates is growing in popularity but is mainly played in affluent areas.

In order to improve the United Arab Emirates women's national football team, many of the top players are involved in cultural exchanges with the United States.

Clubs in Dubai that have women and girls teams: Go Pro Dubai, CF Football Academy, IFA Sport, Alliance Academy, etc.

See also
Football in the United Arab Emirates
United Arab Emirates women's national football team

References

Football in the United Arab Emirates